The 2000 United States House of Representatives election in Vermont was held on Tuesday, November 7, 2000 to elect the U.S. representative from the state's at-large congressional district. The election coincided with the elections of other federal and state offices, including a quadrennial presidential election and an election to the U.S. Senate.

Republican primary

Candidates

Declared
Karen Ann Kerin, lawyer and former engineer

Withdrawn
Lloyd Robinson, transportation consultant

Results

Democratic primary

General election

Candidates
Peter Diamondstone (Democratic), perennial candidate and socialist activist
Karen Ann Kerin (Republican), lawyer and former engineer
Daniel H. Krymkowski (Libertarian), Professor at the University of Vermont
Jack Rogers (Grassroots), farmer and educator
Bernie Sanders (Independent), incumbent U.S. Representative
Stewart Skrill (Independent), farmer and flower grower

Campaign
Kerin, a transgender woman, received national media attention for being the first openly transgender candidate for congress. She expressed frustration with the media focus on her transgender status rather than her political positions, stating to Newsweek that she wanted reporters to "ask me more about what's in my head and less about what's between my legs". There was some surprise at Kerin's decision to run as a Republican, due to that party's opposition to LGBT rights at the time; Kerin stated to The Advocate that she believed that Republicans were stauncher defenders of civil rights than Democrats. Kerin's campaign was primarily based around economic issues.

There was substantial confusion surrounding the reason that Kerin had decided to undergo a sex change; Kerin herself claimed that it was for medical reasons after she was diagnosed with prostate cancer in order to avoid a Colostomy, but an investigation by several newspapers revealed that whether Kerin had ever been diagnosed with prostate cancer was in question, with Kerin's ex-wife claiming that Kerin had simply wanted to change her sex, and Kerin having given an interview to a Delaware newspaper a decade prior were she discussed her reasons for changing sex, not mentioning cancer. When questioned by the Barre Montpelier Times Argus Kerin was unable to explain how getting a sex change would have prevented her from needing a Colostomy.

Endorsements

Results

References

2000
Vermont
2000 Vermont elections
Bernie Sanders